Gastone Prendato (March 4, 1910 in Padua – 1980) was an Italian professional football player and coach.

External links

1910 births
1980 deaths
Italian footballers
Serie A players
Serie B players
Calcio Padova players
ACF Fiorentina players
Juventus F.C. players
A.S. Roma players
Ravenna F.C. players
Italian football managers
Calcio Padova managers
Cosenza Calcio managers
Association football forwards